The 1898 Ormskirk by-election was held on 20 October 1898 after the death of the incumbent Conservative Party MP Sir Arthur Forwood.  It was retained by the unopposed Conservative Candidate Arthur Stanley.

References

1898 elections in the United Kingdom
By-elections to the Parliament of the United Kingdom in Lancashire constituencies
1898 in England
Unopposed by-elections to the Parliament of the United Kingdom in English constituencies
1890s in Lancashire
October 1898 events